The Soviet Union's 1965 nuclear test series was a group of 14 nuclear tests conducted in 1965. These tests  followed the 1964 Soviet nuclear tests series and preceded the 1966 Soviet nuclear tests series.

References

1965
1965 in the Soviet Union
1965 in military history
Explosions in 1965